"True Colors" is the twenty-third and penultimate episode of the thirteenth season of the American television medical drama Grey's Anatomy, and is the 292nd episode overall. It aired on May 11, 2017 on ABC in the United States. The episode was written by William Harper and directed by Kevin McKidd. In the episode Owen Hunt (McKidd) is informed about the fate of his sister, Megan, who's Nathan Riggs' fiancée and had been MIA. Alex Karev (Justin Chambers) discovers the identity of Jo Wilson's (Camilla Luddington) abusive ex-husband, meanwhile the Grey Sloan Memorial's doctors treat a couple from a car accident, only to later discover their true identities as a rapist and his victim.

"True Colors" was conceived as a vehicle to set up the eventual exit of series regular Jerrika Hinton in the season finale. Upon release, it garnered positive reviews, with critics highlighting the performances of the cast, McKidd and Hinton's in particular, as among their best. They were also appreciative of the tense writing and McKidd's direction, although the storyline focusing on Chambers' character drew mixed reviews. It garnered a total of 7.02 million viewers and a 1.8/7 score in the Nielsen ratings.

Plot

Dr. Meredith Grey (Ellen Pompeo) frantically wakes up in the morning with Nathan Riggs (Martin Henderson) at her side after a date night, and she asks him to leave so as not to be discovered by her three young children. Still struggling with the possibility of being in a relationship after her husband's death, she tells Riggs she is not ready for him to meet her kids. At the same time Owen Hunt (Kevin McKidd) gets visited by two army soldiers, who reveal information about his younger sister Megan, who many years previously had gone MIA in Iraq.

Later in the day after seeing him interact with a young child, Nathan is invited by a nervous Meredith to meet her children, after being advised by her sister-in-law, Dr. Amelia Shepherd (Caterina Scorsone), to move on. Owen does not deal well with the news of his sister, having erratic behavior, hostile attitudes towards patients, and experiencing PTSD symptoms; Amelia notices it and confronts him. Owen reveals that Megan was found alive within a basement in a neighborhood held by rebels and she is now in an Army hospital in Germany, however Owen cannot bring himself to believe the news. Immediately, Amelia starts making calls to the hospital on Owen's behalf and eventually contacts Dr. Teddy Altman, who confirms that she had seen Megan. Amelia makes arrangements with Teddy to transfer Megan to Grey Sloan Memorial, and tells Meredith about the situation. Meredith, knowing that Riggs and Megan had been previously engaged before she was declared missing in action, decides that she must go and tell him straight away as she would want to know as soon as possible if Derek were still alive.

After throwing a tablet to a patient's father, who had refused to have his son's brain tumor treated on religious grounds, Stephanie Edwards (Jerrika Hinton) returns to work after attending mandated counseling sessions by Dr. Eliza Minnick (Marika Domińczyk), who was unaware of Edward's personal history of illness as a young child) who had become worried about Edward's behavior with patients. Edwards works with Jackson Avery (Jesse Williams) and Maggie Pierce (Kelly McCreary), attending an unconscious couple who had been found half naked and with severe injuries in a car at the bottom of a cliff. All doctors assume the two were romantically involved and had pulled over to have sex.

The two patients Keith and Alisson are separated for treatment and wake up in different rooms. Keith, tells the doctors he is in love and worried about Alisson; then begs to Edwards to take him to see her. When the female patient, Alisson, gains consciousness with Jackson, Maggie, and Bailey, she becomes nervous and terrified, and asks the doctors if she killed Keith. When she becomes agitated at news of his survival, the doctors don't understand her until she explains Keith had held a knife to her, and forced her to go to drive to an isolated spot in the woods in her car, where he then raped her. She drove off of a cliff in an attempt to save herself from his attack and kill him. Upon discovering this, as well as the fact that Keith and Edwards were nowhere to be found, Bailey orders a lockdown on the hospital.

Meanwhile, in Los Angeles, Dr. Alex Karev goes to a medical conference to meet with Dr. Paul Stadler (Matthew Morrison), who he reveals in a phone call at the beginning of the episode to Meredith that he is Jo's husband whom she has been hiding and running from. Alex fantasies about possible ways to confront the man who had abused and terrorized Jo (Camilla Luddington) into running away and going so far as changing her name to hide from him. In the first possibility Alex gets Stadler drunk and then when they are outside and alone Alex beats him up, but gets caught and winds up behind prison. In the second possibility Alex considers, he thinks about confronting Stadler backstage when he is about to give a speech, and Alex reveals himself as a friend of his missing wife, Brooke (Jo's real name). Alex then threatens Stadler and tells him to stay away from Brooke, he then returns to Seattle to discover Paul choking Jo to death, turning to Alex to say thank you for helping him find her. At the end of the night, Alex still unsure about what to do, that would not result in him ending up in prison, and Jo remaining hidden, he runs into Stadler when they both attempt to claim the same cab. After insisting and conceding the cab to Stadler, Alex watches him leave with a dark look in his eye, which is not missed by Stadler.

After being informed about the lockdown, Keith holds a scalpel to Edward's neck and threatens her to take him to see Alisson. However, they both become trapped on an empty floor with Erin (a young girl who has been wandering the hospital unattended while her distracted parents were panicking and worrying about her younger baby sister who had almost choked to death on a penny). When Keith becomes frantic when Edwards informs him the lockdown will only stop in case of a major emergency, such as a fire; Keith attempts to trick the fire alarm system by lighting on fire a piece of cloth soaked with alcohol. As he tries to hold the lit piece of cloth up to the smoke alarm, Edwards notices and stares at the discarded scalpel he had held to her throat next to the bottle of alcohol he had used for his cloth on the floor. Edwards turns to the young girl beside her, and asks her to turn around and cover her eyes "like playing hide and seek", runs towards the bottle of alcohol, and drenches Keith with it. He catches fire instantly when a stray piece from the cloth, still on fire, lands on his arm, setting fire to him instantly. Edwards turns to run with Erin, but upon looking back, notices that Keith had collapsed beside the oxygen tanks. Edwards attempts to run and quickly to pull him away, but the tanks explode in front of her before she could reach him. The explosion is seen outside of the hospital by Meredith just as she arrives, looking for Riggs.

Production
"True Colors" was conceived as a vehicle for the eventual exit of series regular Jerrika Hinton in the season finale. "It Only Gets Much Worse" was conceived as a vehicle for the eventual exit of recurring role Tessa Ferrer (Leah Murphy) in the 282nd episode.

Reception

References

External links
 

2017 American television episodes
Grey's Anatomy (season 13) episodes